Aliabad Rural District may refer to:
 Aliabad Rural District (Hashtrud County), East Azerbaijan
 Aliabad Rural District (Fars Province)
 Aliabad Rural District (Kerman Province)
 Aliabad Rural District (Mazandaran Province)
 Aliabad Rural District (Taft County), Yazd province

See also
 Aliabad-e Malek Rural District